Bourbon Restoration may refer to:

France under the House of Bourbon:
 Bourbon Restoration in France (1814, after the French revolution and Napoleonic era, until 1830; interrupted by the Hundred Days in 1815)
Spain under the Spanish Bourbons:
 Absolutist Restoration (1814, after the Napoleonic occupation, until 1868)
 Restoration Spain (1874, after the Glorious Revolution and First Spanish Republic, until 1931)
 Spanish transition to democracy, which included Bourbons’ return to power (1975, after the Second Spanish Republic and Franco era, until present)
Naples under the House of Bourbon-Two Sicilies (cadet branch of the Spanish Bourbons):
 First Restoration of Ferdinand IV (1799, after the Parthenopean Republic, until 1806)
 Second Restoration of Ferdinand IV (1815, after the Napoleonic occupation, until 1861 as the Kingdom of the Two Sicilies)